Hall Wood Whitley III (born July 18, 1935) is a former American football player who played with the New York Titans in the AFL, and in the CFL for the Winnipeg Blue Bombers and BC Lions. He played college football at Texas A&M University–Kingsville and is a member of their athletic hall of fame.

References

1935 births
Living people
People from Etowah County, Alabama
Players of American football from Alabama
American football linebackers
Texas A&M–Kingsville Javelinas football players
New York Titans (AFL) players
American players of Canadian football
Canadian football linebackers
Winnipeg Blue Bombers players
BC Lions players